Loonatics Unleashed is an American superhero animated television series produced by Warner Bros. Animation that ran on Kids' WB for two seasons from 2005 to 2007 in the United States.

The series was based/inspired on the Looney Tunes cartoon characters, with the series described by Warner Bros. as an "action-comedy". Loonatics Unleashed is meant to be a mixture of the Looney Tunes shorts' irreverent style of humor and a modern action animated series, with the characters designed in a more action cartoon-inspired style. Unlike previous Looney Tunes-related shows, Loonatics Unleashed has a darker tone and takes place in a post-apocalyptic setting. It follows multiple minor story arcs. The serial format was a great departure from the original source material.

The initial concept designs were met with a huge wave of criticism among fans and there were petitions to have the designs changed. Sam Register, who became WB's executive vice president of creative affairs in 2008, considers the character designs "a reminder of what not to do".

This serves as the final series of the Looney Tunes TV franchise to premiere in the 2000s decade.  After Loonatics Unleashed ended, the franchise would go on hiatus until the release of The Looney Tunes Show on Cartoon Network, four years later.

Plot

The events of Loonatics Unleashed occur in the year 2772, the year that a meteor strikes the city planet of Acmetropolis by crashing into one of its oceans, knocking it completely off its original axis. Instead of destroying the planet, the meteor crashes in a waterfront, releasing waves of supernatural energies causing some of the planet's citizens' genetic codes to be severely altered, granting them special abilities and strengths.

A mysterious and powerful woman named Zadavia calls upon six teenagers of the affected residents to form a team of superheroes. She becomes their commander, dispatching them for the purpose of combating any and all threats to Acmetropolis and its citizens. The newly formed team is known as the Loonatics and reside on the 134th floor of a large tower. These characters are the descendants of the classic Looney Tunes characters, according to multiple press releases and official sources. Descendants of other Looney Tunes are unverified, though they can be inferred in certain situations.

It is later revealed that Zadavia is in fact an alien and had used her powers to knock the meteor slightly off-course, preventing the total destruction of the planet. It is also revealed that a mysterious figure, later revealed to be Zadavia's older brother named Optimatus, caused the meteor to strike Acmetropolis in an attempt to destroy his sister.

In the second season, the show takes on a lighter tone and many more descendants of other Looney Tunes characters are introduced, the majority of which only appear once in the series. The super villain characters from the previous season are rarely mentioned or rarely appear. Zadavia becomes a less mysterious figure and regularly participates with the Loonatics in their adventures. Two more aliens from Zadavia's home planet are also introduced, Deuce and Keyboard Man. In the season's finale, the Loonatics are temporarily joined by Sylth Vester and Optimatus is replaced by Deuce as the series arch-villain.

Main characters

 Ace Bunny: Descendant of Bugs Bunny. Before the meteor hit the city, Ace worked as a stunt rabbit in movies.
 Lexi Bunny: Descendant of Lola Bunny. Before the meteor hit the city, Lexi was trying out to become a cheerleader at Acmetropolis University.
 Danger Duck: Descendant of Daffy Duck. Before the meteor hit the city, Duck was employed as a pool boy.
 Slam Tasmanian: Descendant of the Tasmanian Devil. Before the meteor hit the city, Slam was a fighter in a ring. Due to the nature of his combat, it is implied that he was a pro wrestler in staged fights.
 Tech E. Coyote: Descendant of Wile E. Coyote. Before the meteor hit the city, Tech was a college student at the Acme Institute; although it was never explicitly stated, it is implied he was kicked out under the pretense of being "mad" after one of the faculty misused his machine, though, in his defense, he installed the self-destruct button for extra credit.
 Rev Runner: Descendant of Road Runner. Before the meteor hit the city, Rev was a delivery boy and invented things.

Equipment
The weapons and gear used by the Loonatics are usually made by Tech E. Coyote. They are referred to as "the toys" by Ace, despite Tech's insistence that they are "hand-crafted precision alloy instruments."

 Retrofire Master Blaster (First used: "Loonatics on Ice"): The Retrofire Master Blasters were used to melt the giant iceberg that appeared in Acmetropolis. They were specially equipped with a 'Thaw' mode to melt it, but it seemed to have no effect whatsoever.
 Zoomatrixes (First used: "Loonatics on Ice"): The Zoomatrixes are a series of motorcycles developed by Tech for urban transport. They are capable of changing into an alternate mode which give the vehicles flight capabilities. They are also able to join together to form a flying platform capable of launching missiles and disruptor discs.
 Exo-Vac 2400X (First used: "Attack of the Fuzz Balls"): The Exo-Vac 2400X was constructed by Tech to suck up all the Fuz-Zs in Acmetropolis when the Loonatics learn that the Fuz-Zs transform into monsters whenever they eat chocolate. When Lexi and Danger are caught by Professor Zane, the rest of the Loonatics drop off the Fuz-Zs at HQ and initiate the "Turbo Vac-Jet Mode" of the vehicle to speed to Zane's lair to rescue their captured comrades. Tech has also called the Exo-Vac the "Ultimate Urban Vacuum."
 Ninjizer 500 (First used: "The Cloak of Black Velvet"): When the Loonatics head into the zeppelin to rescue Tech, who is now brainwashed by Black Velvet, Ace brings along the Ninjizer 500, which is powerful enough to cut through steel walls with its "Beam" mode. It also shoots nunchakus and shurikens, which somehow reflects the martial-arts expertise of Ace Bunny.
 Supersonic Transport (First used: "The Cloak of Black Velvet"): The Loonatics use this ship to get into Black Velvet's zeppelin. It can travel at a remarkably high speed and has amazing maneuverability. This high-altitude aircraft is also used in "Apocalypso".
 Grapple Gun (First used: "Weathering Heights"): All that is known about the Grapple Gun is that it was used by Ace and Tech to pull themselves and their comrades out of Weathervane's tornadoes.
 Port-a-Lab (First used: "Weathering Heights"): A ship Tech built which he flew to the biggest and hottest volcano on the planet to defeat the Storm Dragon. However, he had to leave it as it was destroyed by lava.
 Mobile Magma Mover (First used: "Going Underground"): A big drilling machine Tech built to drill through solid rock. It was used by the Loonatics to search for Dr. Dare. However, a sudden stop short-circuited the engines. Luckily, Tech was able to divert reserve power to the front thrusters but since he didn't have a long extension cord, he used himself as a conductor, which jump started the engines. The vehicle is cylinder-shaped with three drills at the front and protected by titanium double shielding.
 The Tech E. Coyote Space Stream 8000 (First used: "The Comet Cometh"): The Space Stream 8000 was built by Tech to get to Optimatus' second meteor. On the way to the big chunk of rock, a wave of cosmic energy strikes the ship and sends it tumbling back down to Acmetropolis. Rev quickly downloads a copy of the piloting software from HQ and gets the ship moving again. The ship has a built-in Laser Amplifier that increases Ace's laser vision power to a 'googol' times (a googol is a one followed by one hundred zeros). When it was used, however, it only peeled off a layer of atmospheric dust. Duck has often called the Space Stream 8000 a "flying dinner plate" because it is based on a flying saucer.
 Gluco-Gel 9000 (First used: "The World is My Circus"): The Gluco-Gel 9000 was designed by Tech to encase targets in a cube of gel. He first used it when he was being transformed into a Galactic Oddity by shooting the DNA Scrambler, thus destroying it. He next used it after the battle with an Oddity version of the Ringmaster by encasing the Ringmaster and Otto in gel cubes. This invention was used again in "The Music Villain".
 DNA De-Scrambler (First used: "The World is My Circus"): The DNA De-Scrambler counteracts the effect of Otto's DNA Scrambler, returning anything that was affected by the latter to regular form. Normally it would take at least two weeks before one could be made, but Tech said he could make one in five minutes with Rev's super-speed. Tech first used it on the transformed children, then himself and the other Loonatics, and finally Zadavia. In the battle with the Ringmaster Oddity, it was destroyed when one of its tentacles smashed it.
 Gravity Stabilizer Gyro (First used: "Stop the World, I Want to Get Off"): Built to nullify the effects of Massive's powers, the Gravity Stabilizer Gyro restores anything that it is pointed at to normal gravity. Tech was able to make a handcuff version to prevent Massive from using his powers. Tech also used it on a robot Massive in "The Hunter".
 Nano Bionic Armor (First used: "Sypher" Redesigned: "Acmegeddon – Part II" Redesigned: "The Fall of Blanc, Part I" and "In Search of Tweetums, Part II"): When all the Loonatics' powers have been stolen by Sypher, Tech constructs six unique exosuits that are designed to replicate and deflect their individual powers. Ace's exosuit has Laser Goggles, copying his laser vision. Lexi's exosuit has a Supersonic Scream to turn Sypher's ultra-sensitive hearing against him. Tech's exosuit has Electromagnetic Palms. Rev's exosuit has Speed Accelerator Technology. Slam's exosuit has Circular Jets so he can spin into his Tasmanian Tornado form. Danger's exosuit has "jellybeans" that randomly change constantly (when one hit Sypher's face, it turned into tar). Danger was rather put off by this, and Tech explained that he had come up with all of it in five minutes. All the Exosuits are colored blue. Later, the Exosuit design is recolored red and enhanced to serve as the space suits that the Loonatics get from Zadavia. In "The Fall of Blank, Part I" and "In Search of Tweetums, Part II", the suits' color is changed once more to black, with some parts color-coded according to which Loonatic it belongs to. The suits are also bulkier (enhancing their protective abilities as body armor) in the season two finale.
 Guardian Strike Sword (First used: "Loonatics on Ice"): Ace Bunny's collapsible weapon of choice. It was given to him by Zadavia when he first joined the Loonatics. Its name was revealed in the episode "Secrets of the Guardian Strike Sword" in the second season, along with the fact that it has hidden powers of its own.
 Atomic Phase Departiculator (First used: "Cape Duck"): Tech made this to take down Stomper; it can phase-shift solid to liquid and liquid to gas. A random beam from this device released Dr. Dare from his petrified state allowing him to terrorize the city once more.
 X3000 Weapons System (First used: "It Came From Outer Space"): Tech designed this system so it looks like a video game. Rev and Lexi inadvertently use it to destroy Melvin's space station. This system also makes a cameo in "Apocalypso" in the second season.
 Molecular Reconstructor (First used: "It Came From Outer Space" Seen again: "The Family Business"): Tech used this device to grow shrunken parts of Acmetropolis back to normal size. It was later stolen by Rev's brother, Rip, after the latter was dominated by a Biotech Brain Parasite. Rip used it to enlarge toys of Rev's design, turning them into dangerous rampaging machines.
 Trojan Horse (First used: "It Came From Outer Space"): The only information shown about this spaceship was that it transported Ace, Duck, Rev, and Slam to Melvin's battleship and it distracted Melvin long enough for Ace and Duck to rescue Lexi.
 Tech-Nabber 6000 (First used: "In The Pinkster"): Tech designed this platform to catch Stoney and Bugsy. It can capture any solid object via a net or a robot arm. Pinkster "accidentally" caught Ace and Duck with it.
 Tech-Nabber 7000 (First used: "In The Pinkster"): An upgraded version of the Tech-Nabber 6000. It backfired when Stoney and Bugsy caught Tech and Rev with it, causing Rev to wonder aloud if it really was upgraded (until silenced, much to Tech's relief).
 Acme Alert 8000 (First used: "In The Pinkster"): This advanced security system was created by Tech to guard the Curium 247 that Stoney and Bugsy were trying to steal. (Actually, the Curium was fake. It was used to lure Stoney and Bugsy.) When Pinkster chased his can into the system's detecting range, it fired weapons, therefore the Acme Alert 8000 must have been based on the X3000 Weapons System.

Principal voice cast
 Charlie Schlatter – Ace Bunny
 Jessica DiCicco – Lexi Bunny
 Jason Marsden – Danger Duck, Rupes Oberon
 Candi Milo – Zadavia, Harriet Runner, Misty Breeze, Queen Grannicus
 Rob Paulsen – Rev Runner, Gorlop, Mr. Leghorn (2nd time)
 Kevin Michael Richardson – Slam Tasmanian, Tech E. Coyote

Additional voice cast
 Charlie Adler – Optimatus 
 Joe Alaskey – Sylth Vester, The Royal Tweetums, Melvin the Martian, Stoney the Stone
 Dee Bradley Baker – Otto the Odd
 Jeff Bennett – Professor Zane, Dr. Fidel Chroniker, Colonel Trench
 Bob Bergen – Pinkster Pig
 Steve Blum – Fuz-Zs
 Dan Castellaneta – College Professor
 Michael Clarke Duncan - Massive
 Bootsy Collins – Boötes Belinda
 Jim Cummings – Additional voices
 Kaley Cuoco – Weather Vane
 Tim Curry – The Ringmaster
 Grey DeLisle – Apocazons
 Jeannie Elias – Elegant Woman
 Bill Farmer – Mr. Leghorn (1st time)
 David Faustino – Time Skip
 Vivica A. Fox – Black Velvet
 Mark Hamill – Adolpho, Ship Captain
 Florence Henderson – Mallory Mastermind
 Mikey Kelley – Rip Runner
 Tom Kenny – Gunnar the Conqueror
 Maurice LaMarche – Ophiuchus Sam, Pierre Le Pew
 Phil LaMarr – Drake Sypher
 Phil Morris - Additional voices
 Daran Norris – Alien Dad, Ralph Runner
 Khary Payton – General Deuce
 Cree Summer – Little Kid
 James Arnold Taylor – Bugsy the Bug
 Simon Templeman – Dr. Dare
 Billy West – Electro J. Fudd, The Sagittarius Stomper
 Serena Williams – Queen Athena

Episodes

Season 1 (2005–06)

Season 2 (2006–07)

Crew
 Bootsy Collins – Theme Song Singer (Season Two)
 Jamie Simone – Casting and Voice Director

Home media

Reception

The series received negative reception from fans of the original shorts. The Looney Tunes franchise went on a 4-year hiatus when the show ended.

In other media
In the New Looney Tunes episode "One Carroter in Search of an Artist", Ace Bunny makes a brief appearance. Bugs Bunny attempts to get the artist of the cartoon to fix his appearance. After turning into his original premiere design, he begs the artist to change him into something more current, and he turns into Ace, prompting Bugs to state, "Okay, now you're just messing with me".
In the Teen Titans Go! episode "Huggbees", when danger is reported to be located at the Warner Bros. studio, Raven asks if someone is rebooting the series, followed by a poster of the series accompanied by a stock scream.
Lexi Bunny, Slam Tasmanian, Danger Duck, and Ace Bunny appear in the Animaniacs reboot episode "Suffragette City".

References

External links

  (Archive)
 
 "Loonatics Promo Short Gives First Look at New Series"
 National Public Radio Talk of the Nation interview about Loonatics Unleashed

Fiction set in the 28th century
2000s American animated television series
2005 American television series debuts
2007 American television series endings
American animated television spin-offs
American children's animated action television series
American children's animated space adventure television series
American children's animated comic science fiction television series
American children's animated drama television series
American children's animated science fantasy television series
American children's animated superhero television series
American time travel television series
English-language television shows
Kids' WB original shows
Looney Tunes television series
Post-apocalyptic animated television series
Television series by Warner Bros. Animation
Television series set in the future
Television series set on fictional planets
The CW original programming
The WB original programming
2000s American time travel television series
Anime-influenced Western animated television series